Loganathan Murugan is an Indian politician and advocate currently serving as Minister of State in the Ministry of Fisheries, Animal Husbandry and Dairying and Ministry of Information and Broadcasting. On 7 July 2021, he was made a Union Minister of State prior to which he was the state president of the Tamil Nadu unit of the Bharatiya Janata Party.

Personal and early life
Murugan was born into a Telugu-speaking Arunthathiyar family. He was born to L Varudammal, Loganathan on 29 May 1977 in Konur of Namakkal district of Tamil Nadu.

Murugan did his law degree at Tamil Nadu Dr. Ambedkar Law College, Chennai and got his master's degree and PhD at University of Madras. Inspired by Hindutva ideology during his college days in 1997, he joined the Akhil Bharatiya Vidyarthi Parishad, and later the Rashtriya Swayamsevak Sangh. He has practiced law for at least 15 years also serving as the Standing Counsel to the Government of India at Madras High Court. As a lawyer He has appeared in various cases on behalf of the BJP.

He is fluent in English, Tamil and Telugu.

Political career

Early political career
Murugan served as the national general secretary of the scheduled caste (SC) division of the RSS while he was in the RSS.

In the 2011 Tamil Nadu Assembly elections, he contested from the Rasipuram seat on a BJP ticket but got only 1800 votes. He served as the in charge of Kerala for some time. He served as the vice-chairman of the National Commission for Scheduled Castes (NCSC) from 2017 to 2020. Murugan later resigned his post in the NCSC before one year of his term's end and met senior BJP leaders.

During the agitations against NEET in Tamil Nadu, Murugan claimed that there were ‘external forces’ in the Suicide of S. Anitha and said that NEET is required. Murugan claimed that there had been an increase of love jihad in Tamil Nadu in January 2020.

BJP state president 
On 12 March 2020, he was made chief of the BJP Tamil Nadu unit. He is the first from the Arunthathiyar community to hold the post.

Murugan was supportive of the Citizenship (Amendment) Act, 2019. He was not very close to the leaders of Tamil Nadu BJP but was close with the National BJP leaders. Murugan attempted to lead the BJP's Vel Yatra twice in 2020 to build support for Hindutva politics in Tamil Nadu, but was arrested both times. Chief Minister of Puducherry V Narayanasamy said Vel yatra is a move by BJP to foment communal disharmony. He called the 2020–2021 Indian farmers' protest in Delhi as “false propaganda” in December 2020.

He contested the 2021 Tamil Nadu assembly elections from Dharapuram and lost to DMK's N. Kayalvizhi by 1,393 votes.

Union minister 
On 7 July 2021, Murugan was sworn in as the Minister of State in the Ministry of Fisheries, Animal Husbandry and Dairying and Ministry of Information and Broadcasting during the Cabinet reshuffle. Murugan is the first from the Arunthathiyar community to be made a Union minister since Independence. He had 21 criminal cases against him in August 2021, the most of any minister in the Modi's cabinet. Murugan claimed there were “vested interests” behind the 2020–2021 Indian farmers' protest in northern states in October 2021.

He is member of Rajya Sabha representing Madhya Pradesh.

References

1977 births
Living people
Narendra Modi ministry
Union Ministers from Tamil Nadu
Indian politicians
Bharatiya Janata Party politicians from Tamil Nadu